Darren Amoo (born June 2, 1988) is a former Ghanaian footballer.

Career
Born in Accra, Ghana, Amoo played college soccer at Liberty University between 2008 and 2011.

On January 17, 2012, Amoo was drafted by Columbus Crew in the 2012 MLS Supplemental Draft third round (48th overall). However, he wasn't signed by the MLS club.

Amoo signed with USL Pro club Pittsburgh Riverhounds on March 29, 2012.

References

External links
 Liberty Flames profile

1988 births
Living people
Ghanaian footballers
Ghanaian expatriate footballers
Liberty Flames men's soccer players
Pittsburgh Riverhounds SC players
Expatriate soccer players in the United States
USL Championship players
Columbus Crew draft picks
Association football forwards